The 2005 Manihiki by-election was a by-election in the Cook Islands electorate of Manihiki.  It was held on 8 February 2005, shortly after the 2004 general election, and was precipitated by an electoral petition finding the result in the seat to be a dead tie. Both parties to the petition, Prime Minister Robert Woonton and Cook Islands Party leader Henry Puna had agreed that in the event of a draw the question should be decided by the voters, and so Woonton resigned.  As a result, Jim Marurai became Prime Minister.

Woonton subsequently decided not to contest the election for personal reasons.  The election was won by Henry Puna.

Results

References

By-elections in the Cook Islands
2005 elections in Oceania
2005 in the Cook Islands
Manihiki